Katerina Khristoforidou (born 4 April 1984) is a Greek gymnast. She competed at the 2000 Summer Olympics.

References

External links
 

1984 births
Living people
Greek female artistic gymnasts
Olympic gymnasts of Greece
Gymnasts at the 2000 Summer Olympics
Gymnasts from Thessaloniki